Andreja Leški (born 8 January 1997) is a Slovenian judoka. She won the silver medal in the women's 63 kg event at the 2021 World Judo Championships held in Budapest, Hungary. She also competed at the World Judo Championships in 2017 and 2018.

In 2017, she was eliminated in her first match in the women's 63 kg event at the European Judo Championships held in Warsaw, Poland.

In 2021, she won one of the bronze medals in her event at the Judo World Masters held in Doha, Qatar. A few months later, she won one of the bronze medals in the women's 63 kg event at the European Judo Championships held in Lisbon, Portugal. In June, she won silver medal in the women's 63 kg event at the World Judo Championships in Budapest, Hungary. In the final, she lost against Clarisse Agbegnenou of France. At the 2021 Judo Grand Slam Abu Dhabi held in Abu Dhabi, United Arab Emirates, she won one of the bronze medals in her event.

References

External links

 

Living people
1997 births
Slovenian female judoka
Sportspeople from Koper
21st-century Slovenian women